"The Hunters" is the thirty-ninth episode and the fourth episode of the third season (1988–89) of the television series The Twilight Zone. The episode centers on a cave with prehistoric cave paintings that come to life.

Plot
A cave with primitive drawings on the walls is discovered on the grounds where a housing community is to be built. An archaeological group from a local university, led by a Dr. Klein, begins excavating the cave. Shortly after, livestock begin to go missing from nearby farms, their carcasses found near the mouth of the cave. Dr. Klein believes this to be an intimidation tactic by James Holsen, the man in charge of the new housing project, which is now on hold thanks to the discovery of the cave.

Her group goes home for the weekend but Dr. Klein stays and continues study of the cave. Sheriff Roy looks into the dead animal carcasses and follows the traces of a recent kill back to the cave, to find a dead animal being cooked and Dr. Klein lurking in the darkness. She claims she is staking out the site because the drawings have been changing. The photos taken earlier show that the cave paintings are different from when the photos were taken. Now suspicious of Klein, the sheriff tries to talk her into leaving the cave but she refuses. The sheriff holds his own stakeout in his truck outside the cave.

Dr. Klein is awakened by footsteps and animal growls. She looks over the drawings and the human figures are gone. She sees people running back and forth inside the cave and tries to make contact. The sheriff hears Dr. Klein scream. Rushing into the cave, he finds her dead, a spear in her back. The sheriff explores the cave but finds nothing. He returns to the entrance to find Klein's body is gone and the cave drawings have become animated, with one figure pulling a prone figure with a spear in it, and many figures with spears moving toward the other figure. He frightens the encroaching figures off with gunfire. He then takes some water and scrubs the paintings off the wall. A primitive hunter appears behind him and throws his spear. When the sheriff finishes scrubbing, the hunter and the spear disappear. The sheriff returns to his truck and leaves.

External links
 

1988 American television episodes
The Twilight Zone (1985 TV series season 3) episodes

fr:Les Chasseurs (La Cinquième Dimension)